The Chief Of Staff Medal of Appreciation is an Israeli military decoration.

The medal was instituted in 1981. It is awarded to both civilians and military personnel who contribute to the strengthening of the IDF or the security of Israel; the medal could also be awarded to foreign civilians.

The medal's most well-known recipient is the Israeli astronaut Ilan Ramon, who was awarded the medal after his death during a mission of the Space Shuttle Columbia.

It has since been given 10 times; 4 posthumously, 2 group awards (Iron Dome and Patriot missile defense soldiers), and the rest to individuals (most of them American).

Design
The medal is round; on the front there is a Star of David with an olive branch and a sword rest on its left; the reverse is plain.

The medal is attached to a white ribbon with two blue strips on the edges, similar to those on the Israeli flag.

Notable recipients
Notable recipients include:

 Colonel Ilan Ramon, IAF (posthumously)
 General Martin Dempsey, USA (Chairman Joint Chiefs of Staff)
 General Joseph Dunford, USMC (Chairman Joint Chiefs of Staff)
 Members of the Kiryat Arba Emergency Response Team for 2002 Hebron ambush 
 Yitzhak Buanish (posthumously)
 Alexander Zwitman (posthumously)
 Alexander Dohan (posthumously)
 Elijah Libman 
 Operation Protective Edge units
 Iron Dome units 
 Technological unit of the Military Intelligence Directorate

References 

Military awards and decorations of Israel
Civil awards and decorations of Israel
1981 establishments in Israel
Awards established in 1981